Owiniga ( Bero, Samo, Taina) is a Left May language of Tunap/Hunstein Rural LLG, East Sepik Province in Papua New Guinea.

It is spoken in Amu, Inagri, Samo, and Yei villages.

References

Left May languages
Languages of East Sepik Province